The Bati–Angba or Bwa languages are a clade of Bantu languages, about half of Zone C.40 in Guthrie's classification. According to Nurse & Philippson (2003), these languages form a valid node. They are:
 Bwa (Yewu, Benge–Baati) – Pagibete, Kango, Bango (Babango), Ngelima (Angba)

In addition, Nurse & Philippson report that Bati–Angba may be a part of Komo–Bira languages. The proposal is called Boan.

Footnotes

References